A hypergolic propellant is a rocket propellant combination used in a rocket engine, whose components spontaneously ignite when they come into contact with each other.

The two propellant components usually consist of a fuel and an oxidizer. The main advantages of hypergolic propellants are that they can be stored as liquids at room temperature and that engines which are powered by them are easy to ignite reliably and repeatedly. Common hypergolic propellants are difficult to handle due to their extreme toxicity and/or corrosiveness.

In contemporary usage, the terms "hypergol" and "hypergolic propellant" usually mean the most common such propellant combination: dinitrogen tetroxide plus hydrazine.

History 
In 1935, Hellmuth Walter discovered that hydrazine hydrate was hypergolic with high-test peroxide of 80-83%. He was probably the first to discover this phenomenon, and set to work developing a fuel. Prof. Otto Lutz  assisted the Walter Company with the development of C-Stoff which contained 30% hydrazine hydrate, 57% methanol, and 13% water, and spontaneously ignited with high strength hydrogen peroxide. BMW developed engines burning a hypergolic mix of nitric acid with various combinations of amines, xylidines and anilines.

Hypergolic propellants were discovered independently, for the second time, in the U.S. by GALCIT and Navy Annapolis researchers in 1940. They developed engines powered by aniline and red fuming nitric acid (RFNA). Robert Goddard, Reaction Motors, and Curtiss-Wright worked on aniline/nitric acid engines in the early 1940s, for small missiles and jet assisted take-off (JATO).The project resulted in the successful assisted take off of several Martin PBM and PBY bombers, but the project was disliked because of the toxic properties of both fuel and oxidizer, as well as the high freezing point of aniline. The second problem was eventually solved by the addition of small quantities of furfuryl alcohol to the aniline.

In Germany from the mid-1930s through World War II, rocket propellants were broadly classed as monergols, hypergols, non-hypergols and lithergols. The ending ergol is a combination of Greek ergon or work, and Latin oleum or oil, later influenced by the chemical suffix -ol from alcohol.  Monergols were monopropellants, while non-hypergols were bipropellants which required external ignition, and lithergols were solid/liquid hybrids. Hypergolic propellants (or at least hypergolic ignition) were far less prone to hard starts than electric or pyrotechnic ignition. The "hypergole" terminology was coined by Dr. Wolfgang Nöggerath, at the Technical University of Brunswick, Germany.

The only rocket-powered fighter ever deployed was the Messerschmitt Me 163B Komet. The Komet had a HWK 109-509, a rocket motor which consumed methanol/hydrazine as fuel and high test peroxide T-Stoff as oxidizer. The hypergolic rocket motor had the advantage of fast climb and quick-hitting tactics at the cost of being very volatile and capable of exploding with any degree of inattention. Other proposed combat rocket fighters like the Heinkel Julia and reconnaissance aircraft like the DFS 228 were meant to use the Walter 509 series of rocket motors, but besides the Me 163, only the Bachem Ba 349 Natter vertical launch expendable fighter was ever flight-tested with the Walter rocket propulsion system as its primary sustaining thrust system for military-purpose aircraft.

The earliest ballistic missiles, such as the Soviet R-7 that launched Sputnik 1 and the U.S. Atlas and Titan-1, used kerosene and liquid oxygen. Although they are preferred in space launchers, the difficulties of storing a cryogen like liquid oxygen in a missile that had to be kept launch ready for months or years at a time led to a switch to hypergolic propellants in the U.S. Titan II and in most Soviet ICBMs such as the R-36. But the difficulties of such corrosive and toxic materials, including leaks and explosions in Titan-II silos, led to their near universal replacement with solid-fuel boosters, first in Western submarine-launched ballistic missiles and then in land-based U.S. and Soviet ICBMs.

The Apollo Lunar Module, used in the Moon landings, employed hypergolic fuels in both the descent and ascent rocket engines. The Apollo spacecraft used the same combination for the Service Propulsion System. Those spacecraft and the Space Shuttle (among others) used hypergolic propellants for their reaction control systems.

The trend among western space launch agencies is away from large hypergolic rocket engines and toward hydrogen/oxygen engines with higher performance. Ariane 1 through 4, with their hypergolic first and second stages (and optional hypergolic boosters on the Ariane 3 and 4) have been retired and replaced with the Ariane 5, which uses a first stage fueled by liquid hydrogen and liquid oxygen. The Titan II, III and IV, with their hypergolic first and second stages, have also been retired. Hypergolic propellants are still widely used in upper stages when multiple burn-coast periods are required, and in Launch escape systems.

Characteristics

Advantages 
Hypergolically-fueled rocket engines are usually simple and reliable because they need no ignition system. Although larger hypergolic engines in some launch vehicles use turbopumps, most hypergolic engines are pressure-fed. A gas, usually helium, is fed to the propellant tanks under pressure through a series of check and safety valves. The propellants in turn flow through control valves into the combustion chamber; there, their instant contact ignition prevents a mixture of unreacted propellants from accumulating and then igniting in a potentially catastrophic hard start.

As hypergolic rockets do not need an ignition system, they can fire any number of times by simply opening and closing the propellant valves until the propellants are exhausted and are therefore uniquely suited for spacecraft maneuvering and well suited, though not uniquely so, as upper stages of such space launchers as the Delta II and Ariane 5, which must perform more than one burn. Restartable non-hypergolic rocket engines nevertheless exist, notably the cryogenic (oxygen/hydrogen) RL-10 on the Centaur and the J-2 on the Saturn V. The RP-1/LOX Merlin on the Falcon 9 can also be restarted.

The most common hypergolic fuels, hydrazine, monomethylhydrazine and unsymmetrical dimethylhydrazine, and oxidizer, nitrogen tetroxide, are all liquid at ordinary temperatures and pressures.  They are therefore sometimes called storable liquid propellants.  They are suitable for use in spacecraft missions lasting many years. The cryogenity of liquid hydrogen and liquid oxygen has so far limited their practical use to space launch vehicles where they need to be stored only briefly. As the largest issue with the usage of cryogenic propellants in interplanetary space is boil-off, which is largely dependant on the scale of spacecraft, for larger craft such as Starship this is less of an issue.

Another advantage of hypergolic propellants is their high density compared to cryogenic propellants. LOX has a density of 1.14 g/ml, while on the other hand, hypergolic oxidisers such as nitric acid or nitrogen tetroxide have a density of 1.55 g/ml and 1.45 g/ml respectively. LH2 fuel offers extremely high performance, yet its density only warrants its usage in the largest of rocket stages, while mixtures of hydrazine and UDMH have a density at least ten times higher. This is of great importance in space probes, as the higher propellant density allows the size of their propellant tank to be reduced significantly, which in turn allows the probe to fit within a smaller payload fairing.

Disadvantages 
Relative to their mass, traditional hypergolic propellants possess a lower calorific value than cryogenic propellant combinations like LH2 / LOX or LCH4 / LOX. A launch vehicle that uses hypergolic propellant must therefore carry a greater mass of fuel than one that uses these cryogenic fuels.

The corrosivity, toxicity, and carcinogenicity of traditional hypergolics necessitate expensive safety precautions. Failure to follow adequate safety procedures with an exceptionally dangerous UDMH-nitric acid propellant mixture nicknamed "Devil's Venom", for example, resulted in the deadliest rocketry accident in history, the Nedelin catastrophe.

Hypergolic combinations

Common 
Common hypergolic propellant combinations include:
 Aerozine 50 + nitrogen tetroxide (NTO) – widely used in historical American rockets, including the Titan II; all engines in the Apollo Lunar Module. Aerozine 50 is a mixture of 50% UDMH and 50% straight hydrazine (N2H4).
 Monomethylhydrazine (MMH) + nitrogen tetroxide (NTO) – smaller engines and reaction control thrusters: Apollo command and service module RCS, Space Shuttle OMS and RCS; Ariane 5 EPS; Draco thrusters used by the SpaceX Dragon spacecraft.
 Triethylborane/triethylaluminium (TEA-TEB) + liquid oxygen – used during the ignition process of some rocket engines that use liquid oxygen, used by the SpaceX Merlin Engine Family and Rocketdyne F-1.
 Unsymmetrical dimethylhydrazine (UDMH) + nitrogen tetroxide (NTO) – frequently used by Roscosmos, such as in the Proton (rocket family), and supplied by them to France for the Ariane 1 first and second stages (replaced with UH 25); ISRO rockets using Vikas engine.

Less common or obsolete 

Less-common or obsolete hypergolic propellants include:
 Aniline + nitric acid (unstable, explosive), used in the WAC Corporal 
 Aniline + hydrogen peroxide (dust-sensitive, explosive)
 Furfuryl alcohol + IRFNA (or red fuming nitric acid) – Copenhagen Suborbitals SPECTRA Engine
 Furfuryl alcohol + WFNA (or white fuming nitric acid)
 Hydrazine + nitric acid (toxic but stable), abandoned due to lack of relieable ignition. No engine with this combination ever went into mass production.
 Kerosene + (high-test peroxide + catalyst) – Gamma, with the peroxide first decomposed by a catalyst.
Tonka (TG-02, approx. 50% triethylamine and 50% xylidine) typically oxidised with nitric acid or its anhydrous nitric oxide derivatives (AK-2x group in the Soviet Union) e.g. AK-20F (80% HNO3 and 20% N2O4 with inhibitor).
 T-Stoff (stabilised >80% peroxide) + C-Stoff (methanol, hydrazine, water, catalyst) – Messerschmitt Me 163 World War II German rocket fighter aircraft, for its Walter 109-509A engine.
 Turpentine + IRFNA (flown in French Diamant A first-stage)
 UDMH + IRFNA – MGM-52 Lance missile system, Agena and Able Upper Stages, Isayev-built maneuvering engines.

Proposed, remain unflown 

 Chlorine trifluoride (ClF3) + all known fuels – Briefly considered as an oxidizer given its high hypergolicity with all standard fuels, but ultimately abandoned in the 70s due to the difficulty of handling the substance safely. Chlorine trifluoride can only be extinguished by flooding the burning area with Nitrogen or noble gases. The substance is known to burn concrete and gravel. Chlorine pentafluoride (ClF5) presents the same hazards, but offers higher specific impulse than ClF3.
 Pentaborane(9) and diborane + nitrogen tetroxide – Pentaborane(9), a so-called Zip fuel, was studied by Soviet Rocket Scientist V. P. Glushko for usage in combination with nitrogen tetroxide in the RD-270M rocket engine. This propellant combination would have yielded a significant increase in performance, but was ultimately given up due to toxicity concerns.
 Tetramethylethylenediamine + IRFNA – A sightly less toxic alternative to Hydrazine and its derivatives.

Related technology 
Pyrophoric substances, which ignites spontaneously in the presence of air, are also sometimes used as rocket fuels themselves or to ignite other fuels. For example a mixture of triethylborane and triethylaluminium (which are both separately and even more so together pyrophoric), was used for engine starts in the SR-71 Blackbird and in the F-1 engines on the Saturn V rocket and is used in the Merlin engines on the SpaceX Falcon 9 rockets.

Notes

References 
Citations

Bibliography

 
 Modern Engineering for Design of Liquid-Propellant Rocket Engines, Huzel & Huang, pub. AIAA, 1992. .
 History of Liquid Propellant Rocket Engines, G. Sutton, pub. AIAA 2005. .

External links 
 

Rocket fuels
Soviet inventions